Ayi Sodogah (born 7 May 1959) is a Togolese boxer. He competed in the men's featherweight event at the 1984 Summer Olympics.

References

External links
 

1959 births
Living people
Togolese male boxers
Olympic boxers of Togo
Boxers at the 1984 Summer Olympics
Place of birth missing (living people)
Featherweight boxers
21st-century Togolese people